Conte may refer to:
 Conte (literature), a literary genre
 Conte (surname)
 Conté, a drawing medium 
 Conte, Jura, town in France
 Conté royal family, a fictional family in Tamora Pierce's Tortallan world
 Conte, the title of Count in Italy and other European countries

See also 
 Contes (disambiguation)
 Contessa (disambiguation)
 Del Conte (disambiguation)